The FC Basel 1909–10 season was their seventeenth season since the club was founded on 15 November 1893. The club's chairman was once again Ernst-Alfred Thalmann, it was his eighth presidential term. FC Basel played their home games in the Landhof.

Overview 
In the 1909–10 season 99 teams took part in the Swiss championships organised by the Swiss Football Association. In the Serie A there were 19 teams. From the regional point of view these were FC Basel and FC Old Boys Basel. In the Serie B there were 41 teams, from the region Nordstern Basel, Concordia Basel, FC Liestal and the second teams from FCB and OB. In the Serie C there wer 39 teams, FC Breite Basel and FC Rosenthal Basel, as well as second and third teams.

Emil Hasler was team captain for the second season in a row and as captain he led the team trainings and was responsible for the line-ups. During the 1909–10 season Basel played a total of 37 matches, 25 friendly games, 10 in the domestic league and two in the newly created Anglo-Cup. Of the 25 friendlies 11 were played in the Landhof. The team travelled to France to play a good victory against FC Hagenau and to Germany tp play Freiburger FC, but here they were defeated. During the winter break they again travelled to Germany. They played a draw with 1. FC Pforzheim on Christmas day and on boxing day were defeated by a combined team with players from Mannheimer FG Union and FC Phönix Mannheim. The team again travelled to France in January, playing a draw with Strassburger FV. Over Easter the team played a tour in Germany, losing 4–0 against Stuttgarter Kickers, losing 5–3 against 1. FC Nürnberg on Good Friday and losing twice against Deutscher FC Prag, 2–1 on Easter Sunday and 4–1 on Easter Monday. In total 8 games were won, 6 six were drawn and 11 ended in a defeat.

The Swiss Serie A 1909–10 was divided into three regional groups, seven team in the east group, six in the central and six in the west group. Basel were allocated to the central group together with local rivals Old Boys. The other teams playing in the Serie A central group were Luzern, Biel-Bienne, FC Bern and Young Boys. Basel ended the season in the fifth position in the group table, five points ahead of Luzern, who were relegated and three points behind the Young Boys, who won the group. YB continued to the finals and played against east group winners Aarau and west group winners Servette. YB won both games and became Swiss champions for the second time in a row.

The first Anglo-Cup was played this season. In the round of 16 on 10 April 1910 Basel won against Young Fellows Zürich, but were beaten by St. Gallen in the quarterfinals. St. Gallen continued to the final, but were beaten in the replay by Young Boys.

Players 
Squad members

Results 

Legend

Friendly matches

Pre- and mid-season

Winter break to end of season

Serie A

Central group results

Central group league table

Anglo-Cup

See also
 History of FC Basel
 List of FC Basel players
 List of FC Basel seasons

Notes

Footnotes 

Incomplete league matches 1909–1910 season: YB-FCB, FCB-Biel, Luzern-FCB, Bern-FCB, FCB-YB, Biel-FCB

References

Sources 
 Rotblau: Jahrbuch Saison 2014/2015. Publisher: FC Basel Marketing AG. 
 Die ersten 125 Jahre. Publisher: Josef Zindel im Friedrich Reinhardt Verlag, Basel. 
 FCB team 1909-10 at fcb-archiv.ch
 Switzerland 1909-10 at RSSSF

External links
 FC Basel official site

FC Basel seasons
Basel